Glade Bay is an open triangular-shaped bay in the Amundsen Sea,  wide at the broad north entrance and defined by the angle formed by the northern part of Wright Island, the front of the Getz Ice Shelf, and the northwest side of Murray Foreland, Martin Peninsula, on the Bakutis Coast of Marie Byrd Land, Antarctica. It was mapped by the United States Geological Survey from surveys and U.S. Navy aerial photographs, 1959–67, and was named by the Advisory Committee on Antarctic Names after Commander Gerald L. Glade, U.S. Navy, a helicopter pilot in USS Atka on U.S. Navy Operation Deep Freeze, 1956–57, and Deputy Commander, Naval Support Force, Antarctica, 1975–76.

References

Bays of Marie Byrd Land